During the 1985–86 English football season, Oxford United competed in the Football League First Division, after promotion from the Second Division the previous season. They secured survival with an 18th-place finish, and won the League Cup, the first major trophy win of their history.

Season summary
Despite the departure of manager Jim Smith, who left for Queens Park Rangers after guiding Oxford to two successive promotions, Oxford United narrowly survived their first ever season in English football's top flight. They required a win in their last game of the season to avoid relegation, which they achieved by beating Arsenal 3–0 at the Manor Ground. The club had greater success in the League Cup, reaching the final at Wembley, where they beat Queens Park Rangers 3–0 to win their first ever major trophy. Unfortunately, due to the ban on English teams competing in English competition as a result of the Heysel disaster, Oxford were unable to compete in the UEFA Cup the following season.

Kit
Oxford United's kits were manufactured by English company Umbro, who introduced a new home kit for the season. Wang Computers became the new kit sponsors. The home kit featured both navy shorts (for the first time since 1950) and navy socks (for the first time since 1935).

Squad

Results

First Division

Oxford United F.C. seasons
Oxford United F.C.